Glenne Aimee Headly (March 13, 1955 – June 8, 2017) was an American actress. She was widely known for her roles in Dirty Rotten Scoundrels, Dick Tracy, and Mr. Holland's Opus. Headly received a Theatre World Award and four Joseph Jefferson Awards and was nominated for two Primetime Emmy Awards.

In 2017, she starred in The Circle and Just Getting Started, the latter marking her final film role, released six months after her death. She also starred with Ed Begley Jr. and Josh Hutcherson in Future Man, Hulu's half-hour comedy television series produced by Seth Rogen and Evan Goldberg; she died on June 8, 2017, mid-way through filming the series.

Early life and education
Headly was born on March 13, 1955, in New London, Connecticut. Her first years were spent living in the care of her mother, Joan Ida Headly (née Sniscak), in San Francisco, and her maternal grandmother in Lansford, Pennsylvania. 

Early in her elementary school years, she joined her mother, who was then living in Greenwich Village. She studied ballet at the Robert Joffrey school of ballet and modern dance at the Martha Graham Studios. In New York, she attended public schools, including P. S. 41, where she was placed in a class for intellectually gifted children. There, a fifth-grade teacher introduced her to the work of Jacques Cousteau in an oceanography class, triggering a lifelong interest in preserving the natural world. She later went on to the High School of Performing Arts, majoring in drama and graduating with honors.

Rather than continuing to study the dramatic arts, she attended the American College of Switzerland, a small college in Leysin from which she graduated with a bachelor's degree. Soon after, she moved to New York, taking day jobs as a waitress so she could work nights in the theater for little or no salary. Later, she moved to Chicago, where she joined the New Works Ensemble at the St. Nicholas Theatre. She was eventually cast in a Goodman Theatre production of Curse of the Starving Class, directed by Robert Falls and co-starring John Malkovich.

Film and television career
While appearing on the Chicago stage in Curse of the Starving Class, Headly was asked to join the Steppenwolf Theatre ensemble, which was looking to expand. She also appeared in several other productions. In Chicago, she was nominated for five Joseph Jefferson awards, and won three for best supporting actress. She received her Actors' Equity card when cast by Vivian Matalon in a summer theatre production of Charley's Aunt, and joined SAG when Arthur Penn wrote a breakout role for her in the film Four Friends.

On August 2, 1982, Headly married fellow ensemble member John Malkovich. Soon after, she replaced Ellen Barkin in Extremities off-Broadway. She then was cast in The Philanthropist, also off-Broadway, and won a Theatre World Award for best newcomer. In New York, she appeared in Balm in Gilead with her fellow Steppenwolf Theatre members, and in Arms and the Man, on Broadway, with Kevin Kline and Raul Julia.

1988–1995: Early work
Headly played several supporting roles in such films as Making Mr. Right, Paperhouse, Seize the Day and Nadine, but her role in Dirty Rotten Scoundrels (1988), with Steve Martin and Michael Caine, truly launched her film career. In 1988, Headly was named Most Promising New Actress by the Chicago Film Critics Association. That same year, Headly divorced Malkovich after he had an affair with Michelle Pfeiffer during the filming of Dangerous Liaisons.

In 1989, Headly played the role of Elmira Boot Johnson in the critically acclaimed TV miniseries Lonesome Dove, a part for which she received her first of two Emmy Awards nominations for best supporting actress in a television movie.

Headly then was cast by Warren Beatty to appear as Tess Trueheart in Dick Tracy. She next starred with Demi Moore and Bruce Willis in Mortal Thoughts, directed by Alan Rudolph. In 1992, she worked on a small Canadian film called Ordinary Magic, and on the first day of filming, met her future husband Byron McCulloch, whom she married in 1993. She also co-starred with Ted Danson and Macaulay Culkin in the 1994 comedy Getting Even with Dad.

1995–2004
Headly appeared in Mr. Holland's Opus, Sgt. Bilko, What's the Worst That Could Happen?, Breakfast of Champions, Around the Bend, 2 Days in the Valley, and others.

Headly appeared in the television movies Winchell, And the Band Played On, Pronto, My Own Country, and Women vs. Men. Headly received her second of two Emmy Awards nominations for best supporting actress in a television movie for Bastard Out of Carolina (1996). She appeared as Julie Andrews and Christopher Plummer's daughter in the 2001 live telecast of the play On Golden Pond for CBS. She was cast in the series Encore! Encore!, starring Nathan Lane and Joan Plowright, from 1998 to 1999, and had recurring roles as Dr. Abby Keaton on ER from 1996 to 1997 and as Leland Stottlemeyer's wife, Karen, on Monk.

2004–2017
In 2004, she played the mother of Lindsay Lohan's character in Confessions of a Teenage Drama Queen. She appeared in the films The Amateurs (2005), The Namesake (2006), Comeback Season (2006), Kit Kittredge: An American Girl (2008), The Joneses (2009), and Don Jon (2013).
Headly appeared in the film Strange Weather (2016) and in the HBO limited series The Night Of (2016).
In 2017, she played Marguerite opposite Morgan Freeman in Just Getting Started.

Future Man
Headly and Ed Begley Jr. were cast in lead roles with Josh Hutcherson in Future Man, Hulu's half-hour comedy television series produced by Seth Rogen and Evan Goldberg. Headly died on June 8, 2017, during filming of the series. At the time of her death, she had filmed five episodes of the planned 13-episode season order. Producers stated that she would not be recast and that the episodes she filmed will air, leaving the writers to rework the episodes in which she was due to appear.

Theater
Headly was an ensemble member of the Steppenwolf Theatre Company from 1979 until 2005, although she never returned to Chicago to do a play after the late 1980s, believing that such a move would uproot and be disruptive to her family. She took a break from the stage altogether for 10 years until 1999, when she starred with Miranda Richardson in Wallace Shawn's Aunt Dan and Lemon, which premiered at the Almeida Theatre in London.

In 1983, Headly appeared in Christopher Hampton's The Philanthropist at the Manhattan Theater Club in New York.
In 1984, Headly appeared in Lanford Wilson's Balm in Gilead presented by the Circle Repertory Company and the Steppenwolf Theater Ensemble.
In 1985, Headly starred as Raina in George Bernard Shaw's Arms and the Man, directed by John Malkovich, in New York.
In 2000, Headly starred as Ellen in Detachments at the Tiffany Theater in Los Angeles, written and directed by Colleen Dodson-Baker.

In 2001, Headly starred as Angela Kennedy Lipsky in the premiere of My Brilliant Divorce at the Druid Theatre in Galway, Ireland. 
In 2003, Headly starred with David Hyde Pierce in The Guys as part of a revolving cast at the Actors' Gang in Los Angeles. She also appeared in Malkovich's production of Shaw's Arms and the Man, with Kevin Kline at New York City's Circle in the Square Uptown.
In 2012, Headly played Eva White in the Geffen Playhouse's production of The Jacksonian, written by Beth Henley. 
In 2016, once again at the Geffen Playhouse, Headly starred in Sarah Ruhl's Stage Kiss.

Death
Headly died of complications from a pulmonary embolism on June 8, 2017, at the age of 62, in Santa Monica, California.

Filmography

Film

Television

References

External links
 
 
Glenne Headly at Find A Grave 

1955 births
2017 deaths
American stage actresses
American film actresses
American television actresses
20th-century American actresses
21st-century American actresses
Drama Desk Award winners
Theatre World Award winners
Steppenwolf Theatre Company players
Actresses from New York City
Actresses from Connecticut
Mensans
Fiorello H. LaGuardia High School alumni
People from New London, Connecticut
People from Greenwich Village
Respiratory disease deaths in California
Deaths from pulmonary embolism